The Venus Model is a 1918 American silent romantic comedy film starring Mabel Normand and directed by Clarence G. Badger. The film was made at the beginning of the 20th century when Goldwyn Pictures and many early film studios in America's first motion picture industry were based in Fort Lee, New Jersey. It is not known whether the film currently survives, and it may be a lost film.

Plot

As described in a film magazine, Kitty O'Brien (Normand), a seamstress in the factory of Braddock & Co., in an effort to escape punishment from the foreman she had mimicked, flees into the manager's office. While explaining her presence she shows a bathing suit she has designed, John Braddock (Francis) embraces the idea and the display of the suit brings orders galore. When Braddock is compelled to take a rest, Kitty takes charge of the plant. She gives a young male applicant a job as office boy, but discovers he is the son of her employer, Paul Braddock (La Rocque), expelled from college. She frees him from an indiscreet love affair and, with the return of the elder Braddock, a romance is culminated.

Cast
 Mabel Normand as Kitty O'Brien
 Rod La Rocque as Paul Braddock
 Alec B. Francis as John Braddock
 Alfred Hickman as Nathan Bergman
 Edward Elkas as Briggs
 Edward Boulden as Bagley
 Albert Hackett as Boy
 Una Trevelyn as Hattie Fanshawe
 Nadia Gary as 'Dimples' Briggs

Reception
Like many American films of the time, The Venus Model was subject to restrictions and cuts by city and state film censorship boards. For example, the Chicago Board of Censors cut, in Reel 4, the intertitle "Well, you be at my apartment tonight and dig up $10,000".

References

External links 

 The Venus Model in the New York Times
 

1918 films
1918 romantic comedy films
American romantic comedy films
American silent feature films
American black-and-white films
Goldwyn Pictures films
Films shot in Fort Lee, New Jersey
Films directed by Clarence G. Badger
1910s American films
Silent romantic comedy films
Silent American comedy films
1910s English-language films